Pat Roy Mooney, for more than thirty years, has worked with civil society organizations on international trade and development issues related to agriculture, biodiversity and emerging technologies. 
He was born and lived on the Canadian prairies for many years where his five children were raised. He now resides just outside the village of Wakefield, Quebec.  
The author or co-author of several books on the politics of biotechnology and biodiversity, Pat Mooney received the Right Livelihood Award with Cary Fowler in the Swedish Parliament in 1985 for "working to save the world's genetic plant heritage." In 1998 Mooney received the Pearson Medal of Peace from Canada’s Governor General. He also received the American "Giraffe Award" given to people "who stick their necks out". Pat Mooney has no formal university training, but is widely regarded as an authority on agricultural biodiversity and new technology issues.  In June of 2017, he received an Honorary Doctorate of Laws from the University of Waterloo, Canada, and a Doctor Honoris Causa from the Mexican Instituto de Estudios Criticos, 17. 

Together with Cary Fowler and Hope Shand, Pat Mooney began working on the "seeds" issue in 1977. In 1984, the three co-founded RAFI (Rural Advancement Foundation International), whose name was changed to ETC Group (pronounced "etcetera" group) in 2001. ETC Group is a small international CSO addressing the impact of new technologies on vulnerable communities. Mooney’s more recent work has focused on geoengineering, nanotechnology, synthetic biology and global governance of these technologies as well as corporate involvement in their development.  ETC has offices in Canada, the United States, and Mexico; and works closely with CSO partners around the worl

Writings (selection)
Seeds of the Earth: A Private or Public Resource?, Food First Books, 1983
Shattering: Food, Politics, and the Loss of Genetic Diversity, University of Arizona Press, 1990,

External links
 Website of Action Group ETC
 Pearson Medal of Peace - Pat Roy Mooney
 Pat Mooney on the Dangers of Geoengineering to Combat Climate Change - video report by Democracy Now!

1947 births
Canadian environmentalists
Canadian non-fiction writers
Living people
Synthetic biologists